Kahriz-e Qaleh Kohneh (also Romanized as Kahrīz-e Qal‘eh Kohneh; also known as Kahrīz) is a village in Baladarband Rural District, in the Central District of Kermanshah County, Kermanshah Province, Iran. At the 2006 census, its population was 480, in 114 families.

References 

Populated places in Kermanshah County